Kushkuiyeh (also Romanized as Kūshkū’īyeh and Kūshkūyeh; also known as Kūshkū) is a village in Lay Siyah Rural District, in the Central District of Nain County, Isfahan Province, Iran. At the 2006 census, its population was 16, in 5 families.

References 

Populated places in Nain County